Zimnyak is a rural locality (a village) in Sidorovskoye Rural Settlement, Gryazovetsky District, Vologda Oblast, Russia. The population was 84 as of 2002. There are 3 streets.

Geography 
Zimnyak is located 34 km north of Gryazovets (the district's administrative centre) by road. Gora is the nearest rural locality.

References 

Rural localities in Gryazovetsky District